Tritoniopsis antholyza is a species of plant in the iris family. Its common name is the Karkarbloom or Karkar Reedpipe.

Range
Like others of the genus, it is endemic to the south-western parts of South Africa.

References

Iridaceae